Grignard is a surname of French origin. People with that name include:

 Ferre Grignard (193982), Belgian skiffle-singer
 Ferre Grignard (1972 album)
 Georges Grignard (190577), French racing driver
 Pierre Grignard (active 191820), Belgian local politician
 Victor Grignard (18711935), Nobel Prize-winning French organic chemist

See also 
 10305 Grignard, a main-belt asteroid named after Ferre Grignard
 Grignard (crater), a lunar impact crater named after Victor Grignard
 Grignard reaction, an organic chemical reaction developed by Victor Grignard, involving the use of a Grignard reagent
 Grignard reagent, an organomagnesium compound developed by Victor Grignard.
 

French-language surnames